John Doukas Komnenos (1128 – September 1176) was a son of Andronikos Komnenos. Through his father, he was a grandson of Byzantine Emperor John II Komnenos. He was doux (military governor) of Cyprus from 1155 until his death as well as being appointed a protovestiarios in 1148.

Life
In 1156, Cyprus was attacked by Raynald of Châtillon and Thoros II, Prince of Armenia; Thoros and Raynald both conducted widespread plundering of the island: the Franks and Armenians marched up and down the island robbing and pillaging every building that they saw, churches and convents as well as shops and private houses. The crops were burnt; the herds were rounded up, together with all the population, and driven down to the coast. John opposed the attack but was captured by Raynald and Thoros and was taken prisoner to Antioch.

The nightmare lasted about three weeks; then, on the rumour of an imperial fleet in the offing, Raynald gave the order for re-embarkation. The ships were loaded up with booty; and every Cypriot was forced to ransom himself.

John was presumably released from captivity in Antioch, as he took part in the Battle of Myriokephalon under Manuel I Komnenos. The Byzantines were defeated and John Doukas died during the battle, shortly after 17 September 1176.

Marriage and children

John Doukas was married around 1146 to a woman later known as Maria, a Taronitissa, possibly daughter of John Taronites, pansebastos sebastos. The couple had at least two children:
Maria (c. 1154 – 1208/1217), married firstly to Amalric I of Jerusalem; from this marriage she had a daughter, the future Isabella I of Jerusalem and then married secondly to Balian of Ibelin, amongst the children produced from this marriage was John of Ibelin, the Old Lord of Beirut.
Alexios Komnenos, led a rebellion against Andronikos I Komnenos, but was captured, blinded and imprisoned, died unmarried in 1187.
 (probably) Theodora (fl. 1140) wife of Bohemond III, prince of Antioch.

References

1128 births
1176 deaths
12th-century Byzantine people
John
Byzantine governors of Cyprus
Byzantines killed in battle
Protovestiarioi